Salt River Township may refer to
Salt River Township, Adair County, Missouri
Salt River Township, Audrain County, Missouri
Salt River Township, Knox County, Missouri
Salt River Township, Pike County, Missouri
Salt River Township, Ralls County, Missouri
Salt River Township, Randolph County, Missouri
Salt River Township, Shelby County, Missouri